The National United University (NUU; ; Pha̍k-fa-sṳ: Kwet-li̍p Lîen-ha̍p Thài-ho̍k) is a public university in Miaoli City, Miaoli County, Taiwan.

NUU offers undergraduate and graduate programs in a wide range of fields, including business, engineering, humanities, law, science, and social sciences. 

NUU has several research centers and institutes, such as the Institute of Law and Intellectual Property, the Institute of International Management, and the Research Center for Sustainable Energy and Environment.

History
The school (then a two-year private junior college) started its first semester in September 1972 as Lien Ho Industrial and Technological Junior College. The college was the only higher education institution in the Miaoli region at the time. On 1 August 1973, it was renamed to Lien Ho Junior College of Technology.

In 1992 the college was renamed Lien Ho College of Technology and Commerce. On July 1, 1995, the Board of Directors donated the school to the Ministry of Education, and the college became a public institution named the National Lien Ho College of Technology and Commerce. In 1999, the College was reorganized into an institute of technology as National Lien Ho Institute of Technology. On August 1, 2003, the institute was upgraded to a university status as National United University.

Academics 
There are five academic programs at National United University:

 College of Engineering Science
 College of Electrical Engineering and Computer Science
 College of Management
 College of Humanities and Social Science
 College of Hakka Studies

Transportation
The university is accessible within walking distance North of Miaoli Station or Nanshi Station of the Taiwan Railways.

See also
 List of universities in Taiwan

References

External links

National United University  English website 
National United University Chinese website 

1972 establishments in Taiwan
Educational institutions established in 1972
Miaoli City
Universities and colleges in Miaoli County
Universities and colleges in Taiwan
Technical universities and colleges in Taiwan